The 2015 Patriot League women's basketball tournament was held March 4, 6, 10 and 15 at campus sites of the higher seed.  The winner of the tournament received an automatic bid to the NCAA tournament.

Seeds
Teams are seeded by conference record, with a ties broken by record between the tied teams followed by record against the regular-season champion, if necessary.

Schedule

Bracket

References

Tournament
Patriot League women's basketball tournament